Yeah is Park Jung-ah's first studio album. It was released on August 25, 2006. It was the 95th-highest-selling Korean pop album in 2006.

Track listing 
 My Time
 결국...사랑 (Eventually... Love) (featuring Jeon Jae-Deok)
 Yeah...
 눈물을 멈추고 (Stop The Tears)
 Fly Away
 D-Day (하루만 더) (D-Day (Just One More Day))
 Don't Let Me Go
 Beautiful today
 이러지 마세요 (Don't Be This Way)
 약해질까봐 (Because I Might Get Weak)
 You're my friend

References

2006 debut albums
Park Jung-ah albums